A total solar eclipse will occur on Saturday, May 22, 2077. A solar eclipse occurs when the Moon passes between Earth and the Sun, thereby totally or partly obscuring the image of the Sun for a viewer on Earth. A total solar eclipse occurs when the Moon's apparent diameter is larger than the Sun's, blocking all direct sunlight, turning day into darkness. Totality occurs in a narrow path across Earth's surface, with the partial solar eclipse visible over a surrounding region thousands of kilometres wide.

Related eclipses

Solar eclipses 2076–2079

Saros 129

Inex series 

In the 19th century:

 Solar Saros 120: Total Solar Eclipse of 1816 Nov 19

 Solar Saros 121: Hybrid Solar Eclipse of 1845 Oct 30

 Solar Saros 122: Annular Solar Eclipse of 1874 Oct 10

In the 22nd century:

 Solar Saros 130: Total Solar Eclipse of 2106 May 03

 Solar Saros 131: Annular Solar Eclipse of 2135 Apr 13

 Solar Saros 132: Hybrid Solar Eclipse of 2164 Mar 23

 Solar Saros 133: Total Solar Eclipse of 2193 Mar 03

Notes

References

2077 05 22
2077 in science
2077 05 22
2077 05 22